Busan IPark is a South Korean professional football club based in Busan, South Korea, who currently play in the K League 2.

Busan IPark have won the AFC Champions League one time. Their most recent participation in the competition was in 2005.

Results

AFC Champions League

Asian Club Championship

Afro-Asian Club Championship

References

 Schedule & Results at AFC.com

External links
 AFC Champions League Official Page

Asian football
Busan IPark